Jamie Turner (born 12 August 1962) is a former Australian rules footballer who played in the Australian Football League (AFL).

Son of Collingwood premiership player Ken, Jamie would also play with the Magpies, making his debut in 1984 coming across from Montmorency. Turner established himself as a top wingman, but had the versatility to play at either end of the ground. 

In 1990, Turner would add the family name to the record books, being the 21st case of father and sons in premiership teams. Turner played on until 1993, playing 160 VFL/AFL games before retiring.

External links 

1962 births
Living people
Collingwood Football Club players
Collingwood Football Club Premiership players
Montmorency Football Club players
Place of birth missing (living people)
Australian rules footballers from Victoria (Australia)
One-time VFL/AFL Premiership players